Enrique Miguel Iglesias Preysler (born 8 May 1975) is a Spanish singer and songwriter. He started his recording career in the mid-1990s on the Mexican indie label Fonovisa and became the bestselling Spanish-language act of the decade. By the turn of the millennium, he made a successful crossover into the mainstream English-language market. He signed a multi-album deal with Universal Music Group for US$68 million with Universal Music Latino to release his Spanish albums and Interscope Records to release English albums.

In 2010, Iglesias parted with Interscope Records and signed with another Universal Music Group label, Republic Records, to release bilingual albums. In 2015, he parted ways with Universal Music Group after being there for over a decade. He signed with Sony Music and his subsequent albums were to be released by Sony Music Latin in Spanish and RCA Records in English. 

Iglesias is one of the best-selling Latin music artists with estimated sales of over 70 million records worldwide. He has had five Billboard Hot 100 top five singles, including two number-ones. As of October 2020, Iglesias holds the number-one position on the Greatest of All-Latin Artists charts. Iglesias holds the record for the most number-one songs on the Billboard Hot Latin Songs chart with 27 songs and the Latin Pop Airplay chart with 24 songs. Iglesias also has 14 number-ones on Billboards Dance charts, more than any other male artist. He has earned the honorific title King of Latin Pop. In December 2016, Billboard magazine named him the 14th most successful and top male dance club artist of all time.

Early life
Iglesias was born in Madrid, Spain, the third and youngest child of Spanish singer Julio Iglesias and Filipina socialite and magazine journalist Isabel Preysler. His father Julio is recognized as the most commercially successful continental European singer in the world. Iglesias was raised with two older siblings, Chábeli and Julio Jr. One of his mother's aunts is actress Neile Adams, the first wife of American actor Steve McQueen, mother of actor Chad McQueen, and grandmother of actor Steven R. McQueen. His father's family is from Galicia and Andalusia; his father also claims some Jewish and Puerto Rican ancestry on his mother's side.

Iglesias found out later in life that he was born with a rare congenital condition known as situs inversus, where some of the body's major organs, such as the heart, are situated on the opposite side of the body from where they would normally be located.

At first, Iglesias and his two siblings stayed with their mother; however, in December 1981, Iglesias' grandfather Dr. Julio Iglesias Puga was kidnapped by the armed Basque group ETA. When Enrique was six years old he lived for a year in the Yugoslav capital of Belgrade with his mother.

For their safety, Enrique and his brother Julio were sent to live with their father and his girlfriend at the time, Venezuelan model Virginia Sipli, in Miami. There, they were brought up mostly by the nanny, Elvira Olivares, to whom Enrique later dedicated his first album.

Education
Iglesias attended Gulliver Preparatory School, a private high school in Miami, where he participated in his first live performance in a school production of Hello Dolly. He then attended the University of Miami in Coral Gables, Florida, where he studied business but dropped out after a year. 

After dropping out of the University of Miami, Iglesias traveled to Toronto to record his first album.

Music career
Iglesias did not want his father to know about his plans for a music career and did not want his famous surname to help advance his career. In Toronto, he borrowed money from his family's nanny and recorded a demo cassette tape which consisted of a Spanish song and two English songs. Approaching his father's former publicist, Fernán Martínez, the two promoted the songs under the stage name Enrique Martínez with the backstory of being a singer from Guatemala. Iglesias was signed on to Fonovisa Records.

1995–1996: Enrique Iglesias
On 21 November 1995, Iglesias released Enrique Iglesias, a collection of light rock ballads, including hits such as "Si Tú Te Vas" and "Experiencia Religiosa". This album, along with Iglesias' next two, was released by the Mexican label Fonovisa. The record sold half a million copies in its first week, a rare accomplishment then for an album recorded in a language other than English, going Gold in Portugal within the first week of release, and sold over a million copies in the next three months.

His song "Por Amarte" was included in Televisa's telenovela Marisol, but with a twist: instead of Por amarte daría mi vida (To love you, I'd give my life), the words were Por amarte Marisol, moriría (To love you, Marisol, I'd die). The CD also yielded Italian and Portuguese editions, with most of the songs translated into those languages.

Five singles were released from the album, such as "Por Amarte", "No Llores Por Mí", and "Trapecista" all of which topped the Billboards Latin charts. The album still holds the record for producing the most number one singles on the Billboard's Hot Latin songs chart. The album went on to win Iglesias the Grammy Award for Best Latin Pop Performance.

1997–1998: Vivir and Cosas del Amor
In 1997, Iglesias' stardom continued to rise with the release of Vivir (To Live), which put him up with other English-language music superstars in sales for that year. The album also included a cover version of the Yazoo song "Only You", translated into Spanish as "Solo en Tí".

Three singles were released from Vivir: "Enamorado Por Primera Vez", "Sólo en Ti", and "Miente", which topped the Latin singles chart as well as those in several Spanish-speaking countries. Along with his father and Luis Miguel, Iglesias was nominated for an American Music Award in the first-ever awarded category of Favorite Latin Artist. Iglesias lost out to his father, but performed the song "Lluvia Cae" at the event.

Insisting on playing stadiums for his first concert tour, that summer, Iglesias, backed by sidemen for Elton John, Bruce Springsteen, and Billy Joel, played to sold-out audiences in sixteen countries. Beginning in Odessa, Texas, the tour went on to play three consecutive nights in Mexico's Plaza de Toros, two consecutive nights at Monterrey's Auditorio Coca-Cola, and two at the Estadio River Plate in Buenos Aires, Argentina, to over 130,000 people, as well as 19 arenas in the U.S.

In 1998, Iglesias released his third album Cosas del Amor (Things of Love). Taking a more mature musical direction, the album, aided by the popular singles "Esperanza" and "Nunca Te Olvidaré", both of which topped the Latin singles chart, helped cement his status in the Latin music scene.

Iglesias did a short tour of smaller venues to accompany the release of the album, with one show being televised from Acapulco, Mexico. This was followed by a larger world tour of over eighty shows in even bigger venues. The Cosas del Amor Tour was the first ever concert tour sponsored by McDonald's.

He won an American Music Award in the category of Favorite Latin Artist against Ricky Martin and Chayanne. The song "Nunca te Olvidaré" was also used as the theme music for a Spanish soap opera of the same name and he sang the song himself on the last episode of the series.

1999–2000: Enrique
In 1999, Iglesias began a successful crossover career into the English-language music market. Thanks to other successful crossover acts, most notably Ricky Martin, Latino artists and music had a great surge in popularity in mainstream music that year. After attending one of his concerts in March 1999, Will Smith asked Iglesias to contribute to the soundtrack of his movie Wild Wild West. His contribution "Bailamos" was released as a single and became a number one hit in the US.

After the success of "Bailamos", several mainstream record labels were eager to sign Iglesias. Signing a multi-album deal after weeks of negotiations with Interscope, Iglesias recorded and released his first full CD in English, Enrique. The pop album, with some Latin influences, took two months to complete. It contained the song "Rhythm Divine", a duet with Whitney Houston titled "Could I Have This Kiss Forever", and a cover of the Bruce Springsteen song "Sad Eyes".

In 2000, Iglesias performed at the Super Bowl XXXIV halftime show alongside Christina Aguilera and Phil Collins and Toni Braxton. Shock jock Howard Stern repeatedly played a tape of a supposedly very off-key Iglesias on his radio show and accused him of not being able to sing live. On 8 June 2000, Iglesias sang the song live on Stern's show with just a guitar accompanying him. After the performance, Stern remarked, "I respect you for coming in here; you really can sing". Iglesias noted that the recording could have been him, but that it was probably a recording made during a television taping where he was required to lip sync and not sing properly. He would remark that the controversy was the best promotion he could have. The album's single "Be with You" became Iglesias' second number-one single on Billboards Hot 100.

2001–2002: Escape and Quizas 
In 2001, Iglesias released his second English-language album Escape. Where most of the Latin crossover acts of the previous year experienced some difficulty matching the record sales of their first English-language albums, Iglesias actually went on to sell even more with the album being certified Diamond for shipments of over 10 million copies. The album's first single, "Hero", became a number-one hit in the United Kingdom, and in many other countries. The entire album was co-written by Iglesias.

Escape is his biggest commercial success to date. The singles "Escape" and "Don't Turn Off the Lights" became radio staples, placing highly or topping various charts both in North America and elsewhere. A second edition of the album was released internationally and contained a new version of one of Iglesias' favorite tracks, "Maybe", as well as a duet with Lionel Richie called "To Love a Woman".

Iglesias capitalized on the album's success with his "One-Night Stand World Tour" consisting of fifty sold-out shows in sixteen countries. Including Radio City Music Hall and three consecutive nights in London's Royal Albert Hall, the tour ended with a big show at Lia Manoliu Stadium in Bucharest, Romania. The concert launched MTV Romania, with the video for "Love to See You Cry" being the first to be shown on the channel.

In 2002, Iglesias decided to release a fourth Spanish-language album titled Quizás (Perhaps). A more polished musical production than his previous Spanish albums and containing more introspective songs, the album's title track is a song about the strained relationship Iglesias has with his famous father.

The album debuted at number twelve on the Billboard 200 albums chart, the highest placement of a Spanish-language album on the chart at that period. Quizás sold a million copies in a week, making it the fastest-selling album in Spanish in five years. All three singles released from the album all ended up topping the Latin chart, giving Iglesias a total of sixteen number ones on the chart. He currently holds the record for the most number-one singles on Billboards Latin Chart. With the song "Para Qué La Vida" Iglesias reached a million spins on U.S. radio becoming the first Latin act to do so. The video to the song "Quizás" was the first Spanish-language music video to be added to the selection on MTV's popular show Total Request Live.The album went on to win the Latin Grammy Award for Best Pop Vocal Album.

That year he embarked on an arena tour of the Americas. The "Don't Turn Off the Lights" tour was completed in the summer of 2002, with two sold-out nights in Madison Square Garden and another two in Mexico's National Auditorium. The tour finished with a single show in the Roberto Clemente Coliseum in San Juan, Puerto Rico.

2003–2004: Seven 
By 2003, Iglesias had released his seventh album, which he called 7, the second to be co-written by him. Among its more 1980s-inspired material, it features the song "Roamer", which he wrote with his friend and longtime guitarist Tony Bruno which featured an appearance from Kara DioGuardi. The CD also contained the song "Be Yourself", a song about independence; the chorus talks about how Iglesias'  parents did not believe he'd ever succeed in his singing career. The first single was the song "Addicted", and was followed closely by a remix of the song "Not in Love", featuring Kelis which was a hit in the UK, Australia, Europe and Asia.

The Seven World Tour was sponsored by Pepsi with Iglesias featuring in an commercial alongside Britney Spears, Beyoncé and Pink and a second ad which featured Not In Love. His biggest world tour to date started with twelve shows in the United States ending with Iglesias playing at Houston Rodeo, and continued on to several countries, most of which he'd never previously visited, playing to sold-out stadiums and arenas in Australia, India, Egypt, and Singapore, before ending his tour in South Africa.

2007–2009: Insomniac, 95/08 Éxitos and Greatest Hits
After a two-year hiatus, Iglesias released his new album Insomniac on 12 June 2007. The album was so named due to it being recorded mainly at night. The record had a more contemporary pop style than that of his previous albums. Its highlights include the songs "Push", with rapper Lil Wayne, as well as "Ring My Bells" and a cover of Ringside's "Tired of Being Sorry".

The album's first single, "Do You Know? (The Ping Pong Song)", was released on 10 April 2007. It was Iglesias' highest-charting song on the Billboard Hot 100 since "Escape". The song was also a hit throughout Europe, peaking in the top 10 in many countries. The Spanish version of the song, titled "Dímelo", was number one on the Billboard Hot Latin Songs chart for eleven weeks, becoming his second best performing song on that chart at the time.

Iglesias followed up with the ballad "Somebody's Me", which was released as a single in North America. The song was played extensively on AC radio and peaked high on Billboards Hot AC. In Europe, the second single was "Tired of Being Sorry", which performed well in many countries; he recorded a version of the song with French singer Nâdiya, which was number one in France for eleven weeks. A solo version of "Push" was added to the soundtrack of the movie Step Up 2 the Streets. The song was regarded as the third single from the album. A music video was shot, which features the film's lead actors. Despite never being officially added to radio, the song has charted in several countries.

On 4 July 2007, Iglesias became the first Western artist to play a concert in Syria in three decades when he performed for a sold-out crowd of ten thousand in the capital Damascus and in the same week, he performed on Live Earth in Hamburg.

The Insomniac World Tour was launched at the Coca-Cola Dome in Johannesburg, South Africa, the same venue he ended his last world tour, and took him to sold-out arenas throughout Europe. It was his first arena tour of the UK, with him playing venues such as Manchester's MEN Arena and Wembley Arena. The tour ended with Iglesias performing at the newly opened L.A. Live. A second leg of the tour took him throughout Latin America, from Mexico to Argentina.

Iglesias's song "Can You Hear Me" was chosen as the official song of the UEFA Euro 2008 football tournament. He performed the song live at the 29 June 2008 final in Vienna, Austria. The song featured on a re-issue of Insomniac, which was released in certain countries.

Iglesias released a Spanish greatest hits album titled 95/08 Éxitos on 25 March 2008, which included his seventeen number-one songs on the Billboard Hot Latin Songs chart plus two new songs. The first single was the song "¿Dónde Están Corazón?", which was written by Argentine star Coti, and became Iglesias's eighteenth number-one single on Billboards Hot Latin Songs. The album debuted at number one on Billboards Top Latin Albums chart and number eighteen on the overall Billboard 200 albums chart. It was Iglesias's second Spanish album to debut in the top 20 of the Billboard 200 (Quizás debuted at number twelve in 2002). The album was certified double Platinum (Latin field) in the U.S. and in some Latin American countries.

The record's second single, "Lloro Por Ti", also reached number one on the Hot Latin Songs chart and had an official remix featuring Wisin & Yandel. Iglesias did a tour of the US to promote the compilation. Beginning in Laredo, Texas, and ending at the Izod Center in New Jersey, he was accompanied through most of the tour with bachata band Aventura, who also performed "Lloro Por Ti" with him at the 2008 Premios Juventud.

Iglesias was a surprise performer at the 2008 Lo Nuestro Awards, opening the show with a medley of "¿Dónde Están Corazón?" and "Dímelo". He also performed at the Billboard Latin Music Awards, where he received a special award.

After the success of his Spanish greatest hits compilation, Iglesias released a compilation of his English-language hits on 11 November. The album includes "Can You Hear Me" as well as two new songs. The first single, "Away", features Sean Garrett, and was followed by "Takin' Back My Love", featuring Ciara. The album debuted at number three on the official UK Albums Chart and sold over 80,000 copies in its first two weeks of release alone.

Iglesias was the winner of two World Music Awards in the categories of "World's Best Selling Latin Performer" and "World's Best Selling Spanish Artist" at the ceremony held in Monaco on 9 November 2008.

2010–2011: Euphoria
On 5 July 2010, Iglesias released his ninth studio album Euphoria, his first work to be released under his new label Universal Republic. The album is Iglesias's first bilingual album, with seven original English songs and six original Spanish songs. It won the Billboard Music Award for Top Latin Album, the Billboard Latin Awards for Latin Album of the Year and Latin Pop Album of the Year, and was nominated for the Latin Grammy Award for Album of the Year. Iglesias worked with three producers whom he had collaborated with before: RedOne, Mark Taylor, and Carlos Paucar. The album features collaborations with Akon, Usher, Nicole Scherzinger, Sunidhi Chauhan, Ludacris, DJ Frank E, Pitbull, Juan Luis Guerra, and his third song together with Wisin & Yandel. In a joint venture with Universal Latino, Iglesias released different singles in both English and Spanish simultaneously to different formats.

The first English single from the album, "I Like It", which features the rapper Pitbull, was released on 3 May 2010 in the U.S. and became a success, reaching No. 4 on the Billboard Hot 100. The song was also featured in the MTV reality series Jersey Shore. "Cuando Me Enamoro" was released as the lead Spanish single from the album, and became the theme song of the Mexican telenovela of the same title, produced by Televisa. The song debuted at number eight and number twenty-five on the U.S. Latin Pop Songs chart and the U.S. Hot Latin Songs chart, respectively. It became his twenty-fifth top ten single on the U.S. Billboard Hot Latin Songs chart and after four weeks of its release date, it became his twenty-first No.1 song on this chart. In January 2011, the album's third English single, "Tonight (I'm Fuckin' You)" broke into the top ten on the Billboard Hot 100, also reaching No. 4. The song was released only for digital download in the United States but was featured on some editions of Euphoria in Europe and some Asian areas. The song became Iglesias' first number one on the U.S. Pop Songs and Radio Songs airplay charts. A remix version of the album track "Dirty Dancer" was released as the fourth English single and became his ninth Hot Dance Club Play chart topper, tying with Prince and Michael Jackson as the male with the most No. 1 dance singles. Further, "Ayer" served as the album's third Spanish single and seventh single overall. The Euphoria Tour took Iglesias across the U.S., Canada, the U.K., and several European countries. One of the tour's legs took him to Australia, while fellow artist Pitbull joined him as an opening act. Prince Royce also served as opening act during the tour's second leg across North America.

In August 2011, Iglesias released the single "I Like How It Feels" to radio. He would perform the track alongside Tonight (I'm Lovin' You) and I Like It and the 2011 American Music Awards and the Dallas Cowboys vs Miami Dolphins Thanksgiving halftime show along Ludacris and Pitbull.

2012–2014: Sex and Love
On 25 August 2012, Iglesias unveiled his brand new single, "Finally Found You", a collaboration with American rapper Sammy Adams. It was released to the US iTunes Store on 25 September 2012. The song was released in UK on 9 December 2012. On 8 December 2012, Iglesias performed at the second annual iHeartRadio Festival were he confirmed he was working on a new album,

Iglesias continued to tour during this period returning to India in October 2012 to perform another series of shows called Tri-City tour in Pune, Delhi, and Bangalore playing to sold-out arenas and stadiums. On 31 May 2013, Iglesias performed at the Mawazine Festival in Rabat, Morocco. The show broke the highest attendance record as more than 120,000 fans gathered to watch the concert.

Iglesias released a number of singles prior to the album release, the first of which was "Turn the Night Up" followed by "Heart Attack" which was released to US Top 40 radio stations. Latin stations were served with the song "Loco", a smooth bachata duet with urban bachata superstar Romeo Santos. The single became Iglesias' 24th No. 1 on the Billboards Hot Latin Songs chart. A version of the song released in Spain featured Spanish Flamenco singer India Martinez and topped the charts in Spain. This was followed by El Perdedor, a duet with Mexican singer Marco Antonio Solis and was the theme to the telenovela Lo que la vida me robó. The song became his 24th #1 on the Latin charts.

On 14 March 2014 Iglesias released his tenth studio album Sex and Love. The release of the album was accompanied by the single I'm a Freak and featured Pitbull The album also featured a duet with Kylie Minogue called "Beautiful", which appears on her twelfth studio album Kiss Me Once. In addition to the previously stated collaborations the album featured guest appearances by Flo Rida, Yandel, Juan Magan, Jennifer Lopez, and Gente de Zona.

The next single to be released from the album was "Bailando", featuring Descemer Bueno, and Gente De Zona. "Bailando" was immensely successful becoming his 25th #1 on Billboard Hot Latin Songs chart. Bailando was #1 for 41 consecutive weeks on Billboard's Hot Latin songs chart becoming the longest reigning #1 in the history of the chart beating the record previously held by Shakira's 25 week run. This record was later broken in 2017 when "Despacito" by Luis Fonsi and Daddy Yankee featuring Justin Bieber Bailando was also a crossover success in part due to a Spanglish version of the song which featured rapper Sean Paul which saw the song peak at #12 on Billboard's Hot 100 and Top 10 on the airplay chart becoming the highest charting Spanish song since the Macarena in 1996. The original Spanish music video of the song was also YouTube's second most watched music video of 2014, behind Katy Perry's hit single, "Dark Horse" and was the first Spanish language video to reach a billion views on the platform. "Bailando" currently has over 3 billion views on YouTube. The song won three Latin Grammy awards including Song of the Year. In addition to the original Spanish version, Iglesias also released two Portuguese versions of the song featuring the Portuguese singer Mickael Carreira and the Brazilian singer Luan Santana.

Sex and Love was Spotify's 7th most-streamed album worldwide in 2014, and "Bailando" was the most-streamed song in both Mexico and Spain. Iglesias was also called the King of 2014, due to his tenth album, Sex and Love, and his hit single "Bailando". Billboard called him "The Crowd Pleaser" of 2014. After more than a decade with Universal Music, Iglesias left the record label in 2015 and signed on with Sony Music.

2015–present: Final

Since the release of Sex and Love, Iglesias continued issuing singles. In 2015, he collaborated with Nicky Jam on the reggaeton megahit "El Perdón" which topped the charts in several countries and has over 1.3 billion views on YouTube. In 2016 Iglesias released his first single under Sony: "Duele el Corazón" featuring Wisin, which also topped the charts in several countries including the US Latin charts and also has over 1 billion views on YouTube. In 2017, Iglesias released "Súbeme la Radio", which features Descemer Bueno and Zion & Lennox. The song has over 1.3 billion views on YouTube. In 2018, Iglesias released two songs, one called "El Baño" with Bad Bunny and the other called "Move to Miami" with Pitbull.

During this period Iglesias would feature on songs by other artists such as RedOne's "Don't You Need Somebody," Descemer Bueno's "Nos Fuimos Lejos", Matoma's "I Don't Dance (Without You)", Jon Z's "Después Que Te Perdí", and Anuel AA's "Fútbol y Rumba".

In March 2020, it was announced that Iglesias would embark on a tour with Puerto Rican singer Ricky Martin. The tour was planned to start on 5 September 2020 in Phoenix, Arizona and end on 30 October 2020 in Atlanta, but the tour was postponed to 2021 due to the COVID-19 pandemic. The song "Me Pasé" featuring Farruko was released on 1 July 2021 and became a hit on Latin radio topping the Latin Rhythm Airplay chart, as well as extended his record for most #1s on Latin Pop Airplay Chart and reclaiming his record for most #1s on the Latin Airplay Chart. 

During a chat with Ricky Martin and Sebastian Yatra, Iglesias revealed that his next album would be released in two volumes, titled Final, as it likely would be his last album. Iglesias claimed, "it's something that I have been thinking about for the past few years" but also insisted, "I'm never going to stop writing songs because I love writing songs, but I'm going to do it in a different way, meaning they don't necessarily have to be packaged as an album, so this project to me is important". On 17 September, Iglesias released Final (Vol. 1), alongside a new single, "Pendejo", followed by "Te Fuiste" featuring additional vocals by Puerto Rican rapper Myke Towers. On 28 March 2022, Iglesias released the romantic ballad "Espacio en Tu Corazón" which served as the theme song for the telenovela Corazón guerrero and will be featured in the upcoming Final (Vol. 2).

Songwriting, producing, and acting

Iglesias has collaborated with songwriter Guy Chambers to write "Un Nuovo Giorno", the lead single from Andrea Bocelli's first pop album Andrea (2004). The song was later translated into English as "First Day of My Life" and recorded by Spice Girl Melanie C for her album Beautiful Intentions (2005). The song has since gone to become a huge hit throughout Europe, and peaked in the number one spot in numerous countries. Iglesias also co-wrote the single "The Way" for American Idol runner-up Clay Aiken. Four songs co-written by Iglesias appear on the UK band The Hollies' 2006 album Staying Power. In 2010, Idol Allstars (Swedish Idol Series) released the song "All I Need Is You", co-written by Iglesias with Andreas Carlsson, Kalle Engström, and Kristian Lundin. He also co-wrote Jennifer Lopez's song "Dance Again", which was released in 2012, and reached the number one position in the Billboard Hot Dance Club Songs.

In 2000, Iglesias co-produced an off-Broadway musical called Four Guys Named Jose and Una Mujer Named Maria. In the musical, four Americans of Latin heritage possess a common interest in music and meet and decide to put on a show. The show contained many references and allusions to many classic and contemporary Latin and pop songs by the likes of Carmen Miranda, Selena, Ritchie Valens, Chayanne, Ricky Martin, and Iglesias himself.

Iglesias starred alongside Antonio Banderas, Salma Hayek, and Johnny Depp in the Robert Rodriguez film Once Upon a Time in Mexico, in which he played the well-spoken gun-wielding Lorenzo. In 2007, he had a guest appearance in the TV comedy Two and a Half Men as a carpenter/handyman.

He also guest-starred as Gael, an Argentinean guitar playing/surfer/massage therapist love interest of Robin in season 3 of the TV show How I Met Your Mother.

Iglesias also played the part of an evil Roman emperor in a Pepsi ad in 2004, as well as appearing in commercials for Tommy Hilfiger, Doritos, and Viceroy watches.

Personal life

In late 2001, Iglesias started a relationship with Russian tennis player Anna Kournikova. The couple have a son and daughter, who are fraternal twins born on 16 December 2017. On 30 January 2020, their third child, a daughter, was born. They live in Miami, Florida.

In 2003, Iglesias had surgery to remove a circular mole from the right side of his face, citing concerns that over time it could become cancerous.

Philanthropy
In 2010, Iglesias was included in the project Download to Donate, run by Music for Relief, an organization started by American rock band Linkin Park. He co-produced Download to Donate for Haiti, a charity album for the 2010 Haiti earthquake, with the co-vocalist of the band Mike Shinoda. Both of them promoted the album at various venues, one of them being Larry King Live, where he and Shinoda explained the project.

In 2013, Iglesias urged his followers to donate money through the American Red Cross to help the victims of the deadly Typhoon Haiyan in the Philippines. The typhoon struck one month after the Philippines was hit by a 7.2-magnitude earthquake which destroyed homes and livelihoods of around 350,000 people.

Iglesias has supported City of Hope, Habitat for Humanity, Help for Heroes, Live Earth, the Muscular Dystrophy Association, Special Olympics, Save the Children, The Salvation Army, and charitable causes like Alex's Lemonade Stand Foundation and hunger relief.

Discography

Studio albums
 Enrique Iglesias (1995)
 Vivir (1997)
 Cosas del Amor (1998)
 Enrique (1999)
 Escape (2001)
 Quizás (2002)
 7 (2003)
 Insomniac (2007)
 Euphoria (2010)
 Sex and Love (2014)
 Final (Vol. 1) (2021)

Filmography

Film and television roles

Soundtrack and self appearances

Tours
Headlining
Vivir World Tour 
Cosas del Amor World Tour 
2000 Tour 
One Night Stand Tour 
Don't Turn Off The Lights Tour 
Seven World Tour 
Insomniac World Tour 
Greatest Hits Tour 
Euphoria Tour 
Sex and Love Tour 
All the Hits Live 

Co-headlining
Enrique Iglesias & Jennifer Lopez Tour 
Enrique & Pitbull on Tour 
Enrique Iglesias And Pitbull Live! 
 Enrique Iglesias and Ricky Martin Live in Concert

Awards and nominations

Iglesias has won more than 200 awards from various ceremonies including 23 Billboard Music Awards and 36 Billboard Latin Music Awards, as well as 8 American Music Awards, 1 Grammy (with 3 times nomination), 5 Latin Grammy Awards, 10 World Music Awards, 6 MTV awards, 19 Premios Lo Nuestro Awards (with 24 times nomination) and 15 Premios Juventud Awards (with 21 times nomination) etc. He has been nominated over 465 times for various awards. He also won an award for Best International Pop Act at the MTV India Awards, as well as being named "King of Latin Pop". In 2000, he was awarded Most Fashionable Artist at the VH1/Vogue Fashion Awards. In 2001, for the release of his second English studio album Escape, he received awards for Best-Selling Pop Male Artist and European Male Artist at the World Music Awards. And for the first time ever in the history of Billboard Music Awards Enrique Iglesias was awarded with "Top Latin Artist of All Time" Title and Award at Billboard Latin Music Awards 2020.

See also

References

External links

 
 

 
1975 births
Living people
20th-century Spanish singers
21st-century American singers
21st-century Spanish singers
Dance-pop musicians
English-language singers from Spain
Fonovisa Records artists
Grammy Award winners
Gulliver Preparatory School alumni
Enrique
Interscope Records artists
Latin Grammy Award winners
Latin music songwriters
Latin pop singers
Male actors from Madrid
Male actors from Miami
MTV Europe Music Award winners
Musicians from Madrid
Musicians from Miami
People from Madrid
RCA Records artists
Republic Records artists
Singers from Florida
Singers from Madrid
Songwriters from Florida
Sony Music Latin artists
Sony Music Spain artists
Spanish dance musicians
Spanish emigrants to the United States
Spanish expatriates in the United States
Spanish male composers
Spanish male singers
Spanish male television actors
Spanish people of Filipino descent
Spanish people of Jewish descent
Spanish people of Puerto Rican descent
Spanish philanthropists
Spanish pop singers
Spanish record producers
Spanish Roman Catholics
Spanish songwriters
Universal Music Latin Entertainment artists
University of Miami alumni
World Music Awards winners